American actress and singer Liza Minnelli has been honored with numerous awards and nominations for her work in film, television, and theatre. Among the awards she has received is an Academy Award for Best Actress for Cabaret.

Film awards

Academy Awards

British Academy of Film and Television Arts

Golden Globe Awards

Television awards

Emmy Awards (Primetime)

Golden Globe Awards

Screen Actors Guild Awards

Stage awards

Drama Desk Awards

Tony Awards

Recording awards

Grammy Awards

 1990: Grammy Living Legend Award for Contributions and Influence in the Recording Field
 2008: Inducted into the Grammy Hall of Fame Award (Cabaret Original Soundtrack Recording)

Miscellaneous honors
Hasty Pudding Theatricals
 1973: Hasty Pudding Woman of the Year

Gay & Lesbian Alliance Against Defamation
 2005: Vanguard Award, for "her contributions to increased visibility and understanding of the lesbian, gay, bisexual and transgender (LGBT) community"

Mercy College (New York)
 2007: Honorary Doctorate, "for her charitable activities and a career that has spanned five decades and multiple genres"

Parents, Families and Friends of Lesbians and Gays
 2010: Straight for Equality in Entertainment Award, for "her lifelong support of lesbian, gay, bisexual, and transgender (LGBT) people."

Stamford Center for the Arts/Palace Theatre
2012: Arts Legacy Award 
 2012: Fred and Adele Astaire Awards
 Douglas Watt Lifetime Achievement Award

Ride of Fame
 2011: The Ride of Fame honored Minnelli by dedicating a double decker tour bus to her life's work in New York City 

Golden Raspberry Awards
 1988: Worst Actress Winner for Rent-a-Cop and Arthur 2: On the Rocks combined.

References

Lists of awards received by American actor
Lists of awards received by American musician